The Games and Amusements Board (GAB) is the government-ran regulatory body of professional sports in the Philippines.

History
The Games and Amusements Board initially started its operation in 1951 with the issuance of Executive Order No. 392. Through this particular law, the powers, duties and functions previously exercised, and performed by:

the city and municipal mayors over fronton and basque pelota games
the Boxing and Wrestling Commission over boxing and wrestling
the Commission on Races over horse racing, were consolidated and transferred to the Board

On March 20, 1974, upon the signing into law of Presidential Decree No. 420 creating the Philippine Racing Commission, the authority over horse racing was divided between the Board and the Philracom. GAB retained the function of supervision and regulation of the betting aspect of horse racing, while all other functions related to horse racing were transferred to Philracom.

On January 6, 1976, the scope of GAB's regulatory function over professional sports widened as the agency was tasked to likewise supervise and regulate the professional basketball and other professional games in the country.

The Board's regulatory function was also made more specific against anti-illegal gambling operations with the establishment of Anti-Illegal Gambling Unit (AIGU) on January 17, 1992 – which became one of GAB's units. AIGU initially was composed of personnel appointed by the Chairman of GAB and detailed staff from the Philippine National Police, the National Bureau of Investigation, the Philippine Racing Commission, the Philippine Charity Sweepstakes Office, other offices involved in gambling operations, as well as other law enforcement agencies in the country. On December 28, 1993, the board assumed part of the overall functions of the Gamefowl Commission, particularly insofar as international cockfight derbies are concerned.

In October 2020, GAB issued a joint order with the Philippine Sports Commission classifying any athlete who gets paid for non-national team play will be considered as professionals. Any sporting events which are conducted for profit were classified as professional in nature.

Leadership
GAB, as an organization, is headed by a chairman and two commissioners

 Chairman: Richard Santos Clarin
 Commissioner for Administrative and Finance: TBA
 Commissioner for Operations: TBA

Scope

Sports and activities
Among professional sports and activities that the GAB regulates are:
Sports
Association football
Basketball
Billiards
Bowling
Boxing (including women's)
eSports
Karate
Mixed martial arts
Table tennis
Tennis
Wrestling

Other activities
Cockfighting
horse racing betting

It is also mandated to crack down against illegal gambling practices in professional sports.

Leagues
The following are the national and top-flight sports leagues that are sanctioned by the GAB.

GAB considers leagues where participating athletes "play for pay" should be under its supervisions under its mandate. In November 2018, the GAB has announced plans to put leagues which meets this criteria under its supervision such as volleyball league Spikers' Turf despite some of the leagues' players still simultaneously playing in collegiate leagues.

Combat Sports Organizations
Filipino Pro Wrestling
Manila Wrestling Federation
ONE Championship
Underground Battle MMA
Universal Reality Combat Championship
Ultimate Muaythai Challenge Philippines

References

Sports organizations of the Philippines
Gambling in the Philippines
1951 establishments in the Philippines
Government agencies established in 1951
Sports organizations established in 1951
Government agencies of the Philippines
Establishments by Philippine executive order
Government sports agencies
Government agencies under the Office of the President of the Philippines